The Thiruvananthapuram–Nagercoil–Kanyakumari line is a line in the Southern Railway zone of Indian Railways. It connects the cities Thiruvananthapuram and Nagercoil. The railway opened on 15 April 1979. This is the southernmost section of Indian Railways. The terminus of the line is at Kanyakumari railway station.

History 
In 1955, a survey for the railway line was sanctioned. It was completed in 1965, and construction began on 6 September 1972 with a ceremony with Prime Minister Indira Gandhi. On 15 April 1979, the line began to operate.

The Thiruvananthapuram-Nagercoil-Kanyakumari railway line is fully electrified. Track doubling work is in progress and is expected to finished in 2022.

Stations 
There are 16 railway stations along the line. , the second satellite passenger terminal to the proposed , also comes under this section.

The train line has seen financial gain, and its earnings are shown below. Stations in bold letters generated a minimum of 2 crore.

Rail traffic 
Around 21 trains run on the line. More trains are expected to be introduced along the route with the completion of track doubling.

The operating speed of trains running between Thiruvananthapuram to Nagercoil ranges from 80 to 100 km per hour. Trains operating from Kanyakumari to Nagercoil run from 75 to 90 km per hour.

Notes

References

External links

5 ft 6 in gauge railways in India
+
Railway lines opened in 1979